Lonak Glacier is one of the three major glaciers of Sikkim, in the Himalaya range in the north-east of India.

See also
Sikkim
List of glaciers

References 

Glaciers of Sikkim